The Lands of Borland formed an estate lying between Aiket Castle and the town of Dunlop, East Ayrshire, Parish of Dunlop, Scotland. The laird's house at Borland stood near the Sandy Ford over the Glazert Water. The names Bordland, Boreland, Borland, Laigh Borland, Low Borland and Nether Borland have all been applied to the site of the laird's house.

History

The Mansion House, Castle, Farm and Estate

In 1848 the Scottish Journal records that a number of years ago the foundation of a ruin of considerable extent was removed by the late proprietor. In 1853 Mr. Dobie recorded that There can still be traced the meiths (boundary line) of a building of considerable extent on the top of the Hill of Borland. Mr. G. Howie, of Dunlop in 1856, stated that he remembered seeing a small portion of what was said to be one of the walls about 70 or 80 years ago. It was a sort of bank, quite crumbled down and overgrown with grass. Since then, the ruins of a building of considerable extent have been removed and the ground cultivated. On the southern side of the hill there are the remains of  a wide ditch or fosse, locally known as the 'Cuckoo slide.'  Paterson in 1866 states that the foundation of a ruin was removed some years ago by a late proprietor.

A local tradition is that the monks of Kilwinning Abbey had a hospice for their brethren at Borland where medicinal herbs were grown in a formal garden. It is recorded that a two merk land at Dunlop was appropriated to the church and the remainder used by the monks. Borland may have been similar to Monkredding near Kilwinning that was also once held by the Tironensian monks of Kilwinning Abbey and was the 'Monk's Garden', effectively a rest home for the brothers.

Borland
A substantial and ornately carved table style gravestone in the Dunlop graveyard records a William Anderson who died aged 70 on 3 December 179(?)6 and his wife who died in 1784. The memorial was erected by his son Robert Anderson of Borland. This stone is now leaning against the 'Picture House' building.

The 1797-98 Farm Horse Tax records list John Dunlop's horses at Laigh Borland.

In around 1823 Andrew and Mary Brown inherited "the original mansion, lately rebuilt, on the banks of the Glazert, in a remarkable pleasant situation.." Mary Dunlop married Andrew Brown of Craighead, the eldest son of John Brown of Hill and received as her inheritance the portion of Borland that contained the old mansion house, "..romantically situated by the Glazert Water..". One of their first acts was to rebuild the old mansion house. These reports do not agree on when Borland was rebuilt however the early 19th century seems likely. The walled garden was probably built in the 19th century and stones from the old castle may have been used in its construction.

Borland, later Nether or Laigh Borland, was described in the OS 'Name Book' of 1855-57 as being composed of "Two small farm houses & steadings with gardens etc. attached, in a sheltered situation on the side of Glazert Burn about ½ mile south-west of Dunlop, the property of Andrew Brown Esq. of Hill and occupied by Mr. James Templeton and Mr. Robert Frew."

Walled gardens are not generally associated with farms and the presence of one at Borland suggests that the site at one time had a higher status than that of a tenanted farm. The walled garden is square, probably originally 18th century in date with its south, east and west walls rebuilt circa 1916 and greatly reduced in height and also in length. They are mainly built from random rubble with flat sandstone copings and are much thinner than the north wall. The prominent cylindrical gate piers with conical caps to the south also date from 1916 and are placed slightly back from the line of the wall. An old door on the east side has been blocked off. A culvert or cundy runs beneath the garden and exists as a stream on the north side that drains into the Glazert Water. The north wall was not altered in 1916. A sundial is indicated as standing in the centre of the garden and is visible in an old black and white photograph.

Laigh Borland was demolished in the mid 20th century and it is recorded that a 16th or 17th century datestone with the initials of the Brown family once existed above the entrance door of the attached building that was latterly a kitchen. Its relative inaccessibility due to the ford had been partly overcome by a hardcore access from Over Borland however it had fallen into disrepair and the council required its demolition on safety grounds as a public access still existed via North Borland with a pedestrian crossing at the ford for footpath walkers, the concrete bases used as handrails supports are still present.

The workers cottages, one occupied by Mrs Watt, were thatched up until demolition and an associated small ruined building, probably a pigsty, still exists partly built into the hillside. The family grave of the Watt family records that Martha Watt née Stevenson died in 1916 at Laigh Borland at the age of 81. The cottages were demolished shortly after this date and the changes to the walled garden enacted at the same time.

In 1913 a wooden footbridge crossed the Glazert Water and stepping stones were present.

Over Borland
Robert Wilson of Over Borland was married to Agnes Gemmill who died in November 1636. In her Will she bequeathed legacies to her grandsons John Dunlop and William Gemmill.

John Dunlop of Over Borland married Elizabeth Walkinshaw and in 1650 was valued at 100 Scots.

A gravestone in Dunlop's churchyard records the deaths of John Dunlop of Over Borland, his wife Jean Gilmour and their children, namely John who died aged 4 in 1778, Margaret who died aged 5 months in 1784, William who died aged 3 in 1792, John who died aged 12 in 1792 and Jane who died aged 27 in 1804. Jean Gilmour died in 1827.

Over Borland is a  Category 'C' Listed farm house located at the end of a lane that branches off from the lane to Dunlop near the Millennium Woodlands (55.7099, -4.5491) (NS239940, 6492150).  The building carries a 1770 datestone inscribed 'RN JS 1770' and another stone next to the doorway inscribed 'JMN MRS 1912'.

Over Borland in 1855-1857 is recorded as "A small farm house & steading with garden & land attached about half a mile south-west of Dunlop, belonging to Andrew Brown Esq. and occupied by Mrs. Watt." Together with 'Hill' aka 'Over Hill' is one of the oldest surviving 2-storey farmhouses in Dunlop parish.

A possible date for the removal of the old castle masonry would be 1781 + or - 5 years which effectively embraces the year 1770, the date of the probable rebuilding of Over Borland as stated on the 'RN JS 1770' date stone. It has been stated that the enlargement of Over Borland was carried out to provide a replacement for Borland aka Laigh Borland and this property was later let out to tenants.

A family gravestone in Dunlop parish church graveyard records a John Watt, farmer in Boreland (sic) whose wife was Ann Craig. This couple had offspring Catherine and Matthew who died young and a son who inherited, David, living to 79 years of age and dying in 1881. David's wife was Martha Stevenson who died in 1916 at Leigh (sic) Borland.

North Borland
Jane Dunlop married Thomas Reid of Balgray near Irvine and inherited the North Borland portion of the Lands of Borland, their son John Dunlop Reid then inherited North Borland. Thomas and Jane Reid built a fine new house at North Borland.

Other Borland properties
Hill or Over-Hill of Dunlop was once part of the Lands of Borland, passing to the Brown family through marriage, notably the burial stone of John Dunlop of Overhill and Barbara Gilmour his wife is located in Dunlop churchyard with the date 1732. John Dunlop's grandson, Andrew Brown, is also recorded, dated 1794.

John Dunlop and Barbara Gilmour had one child, Mary, who married Allan Brown of Gabroch-hill and several generations and inter-marriages later Andrew Brown of Craighead married the aforementioned Mary Dunlop of Borland and the couple later inherited Hill or Overhill.

Borlandhills and several other properties were once part of the Lands of Borland.

The Lairds
The native chiefs, although displaced from Boarland Hill (sic) do not appear to have been exiled, instead they established themselves as the Dunlops of that Ilk at what is now Dunlop House on the Clerkland Burn.

A tradition states that the De Ross first held Borland or Dunlop Hill (NS 4019 4940) as their seat and a well-fortified stone built structure existed there, later their seat was moved to Corsehill in Stewarton. A Celtic hillfort may have existed here, as suggested by the etymology of the placename. Corsehill Castle became their primary residence after Godfrey de Ross was granted the Lands of Stewarton.

The De Ross family were vassals to the De Morvilles, Overlords of Cunninghame. The De Morvilles backed John Balliol's claim to the crown and forfeited their lands to the Boyds, and in 1570 the lands were held by the Cassilis family. Timothy Pont records that Over and Nether Borland were held by the Kennedys, Earls of Cassilis in the early 17th century, the lands having passed to them from Godfrey de Ross who "..hauing his refidence heir enioyed ample possefions abrode in ye countrey and ves for ye tyme Shriffe of Aire." Alexander Cunninghame of Aiket married the sister of the Earl of Cassilis and this may explain how Borland passed into Cunninghame of Aiket hands.

The name 'Borland' is popularly thought to derive from the hunting of boar in the area however another authority points out that "Bordlands signifie the desmenes which lords keep in their hands for the maintenance of their board or table." The De Ross family were vassals of Richard de Morville.

Prior to 1597 the 6 Merk land of the nearby estate of Hapland was part of the Lands of Dunlop and David Dunlop, fourth of Hapland, exchanged or excambied Hapland for the Lands of Borland  1600 accordingly to Robertson. Although a merk land was a measure of rental value it can be estimated that 6 merks would be between 6 and 12 acres. 1660 is another suggested date for when Patrick Cuninghame exchanged his lands of Borland for those of nearby Hapland.

John Dunlop, fourth of Borland, married a Montgomerie of High Cross near Stewarton and had three children, one of whom died young. The eldest son, John, inherited and his brother is designated James of Loanhead. John Dunlop, fifth of Borland, married Mary Clark of Shitterflat (sic) who was the daughter of William Clerk, portioner of that property and his spouse Margaret Simpson. The couple had four sons and two daughters with the eldest son, John, inheriting.

The Dunlops of Borland continued in possession until the male line ended sometime around 1823 with two daughters, Mary and Jane, the parents being John Dunlop (sixth of Borland) and Jean, daughter of John Gilmour of Tailend in situated in the east of Dunlop parish. They had a large family however only Mary and Jane survived to adulthood.

Mary Dunlop married Andrew Brown of Craighead, the eldest son of John Brown of Hill and received as her inheritance the portion of Borland that contained the old mansion house, "..romantically situated by the Glazert Water..". One of their first acts was to rebuild the old mansion house. The couple had two sons and six daughters with the eldest son, John Brown, inherited Borland and is recorded as 'John Brown of Hill, Craighead and Borland' who married Marion Duncan of Brockwellmuir and this couple had three sons and two daughters, the eldest son being John Brown.

As stated, Jane Dunlop married Thomas Reid of Balgray near Irvine and inherited the North Borland portion of the Lands of Borland, their son John Dunlop Reid then inherited North Borland.

Thomas and Jane Reid built a fine new house at North Borland whilst Andrew and Mary Brown inherited "the original mansion, lately rebuilt, on the banks of the Glazert, in a remarkable pleasant situation.."

The Lands of Borland were apparently held for many years by what might be best described as 'Bonnet Lairds', named from petty landowners who wore a hat or bonnet like the humble working labourers. It seems that Over Borland was the farm or 'mains' associated with the 'Laird's' house and this is born out by the fact that Borland never had all the required buildings associated with a working farm and was embellished with a walled garden usually associated with mansion houses.

The 1586 Murder of the 4th Earl of Eglinton

On 4 November 1570, William and Alexander Cunninghame of Aiket were brought to trial for ambushing and together with others, killing John Mure of Caldwell on the Lands of Borland, however they were acquitted. An old tradition relates that 'shortly' after the murder of John Mure, the young Dunlop Laird of Hapland was persuaded against his mother's wishes to join the Cunninghames of Aiket in a raid on one of their neighbours that they were feuding with. The laird's mother had a dream that predicted her son's death and it indeed came to pass that he fell, mortally wounded, on the banks of the Annick Water, near Stewarton and his horse foaming and spent returned riderless to Hapland, having escaped from the field 
of battle where his master had died.

This old tradition seems to relate to the Murder of Hugh Montgomerie, 4th Earl of Eglinton at the Annick Ford in Stewarton in 1586 that occurred as a consequence of the long running feud between the Montgomeries, Earls of Eglinton and the Cunninghames, Earls of Glencairn, families who were competing for power and influence locally and nationally. The significant repercussions of this act were felt throughout the county of Ayrshire and beyond. In the list of the conspirators there is a Gilbert Dunlop, however he is recorded as a servant of 'Patrick of Baidland'. Paterson records that a Gilbert Dunlop existed in 1498 so it was a name used by the family. Patrick Cunninghame of Bordland (sic) was certainly present at the ambush.

It is interesting that as detailed above Patrick Cunninghame shortly after excambied or exchanged his 'Lands of Borland' for those of David Dunlop's 'Lands of Hapland'. The reasons for this exchange could relate in some way to the aforementioned incident and its many repercussions. In 1612 Patrick Cunninghame however sold these lands to Gabriel Porterfield, son of Alexander Porterfield of that Ilk.

Cartographic evidence
The OS maps indicate that the main entrance to Laigh Borland was via the Sandy Ford lane that ran past North Borland and crossed the Glazert water. A minor access branched off from the lane to Over Borland and ran down the steep lower slope of Borland Hill to enter close to the walled garden's south-eastern corner. A footpath with a stile ran down from Over Borland to Laigh Borland.

In 1856 Laigh Borland was recorded as 'Borland' whilst Over Borland did carry the name is still has today. The walled garden is shown with internal beds equally divided into four by paths with an entrance off Sandy Ford Lane. A small structure stands at the front entrance of the walled garden. A well is shown close to the old worker's cottages and another lies off the end of a well made path that extends towards the Glazert behind Borland House. A lane or more likely a cart track runs from Borland and eventually joins the lane to Over Borland. The land behind Borland is wooded with a rectangular open area. The Sandy Ford appears to have stepping stones and provides the only vehicular access to Borland House.

In 1895 a small pond is located behind the north wall of the walled garden that no longer has a formal laid out interior. A footbridge stands at the ford and a second path links what is now marked as Laigh Borland with the lane out towards Dunlop via the Straitbow Bridge. Two small buildings stand against the walled garden, south and west walls.

The 1909 OS map shows a few changes in that the pond is not marked, only a single track runs up towards the Dunlop road via the Straitbow Bridge and the farm cottages have fenced or walled enclosures behind them. A sundial is indicated as standing in the centre of the garden.

By 1957 Laigh Borland is not named separately and a road access has been constructed from Over Borland via the Middle Rig field and the worker's cottages have been demolished, no doubt supplying hard core for the new access. The cottages were present in 1925.

Place names

The name Boarland (sic) could refer to the presence of wild boar, however a 'Boor' also meant a serf and Norman lords often apportioned lands near their castles for their servants. Another interpretation is that Borland or Bordland meant the land that was granted to the feudal superior, Godfrey de Ross, specifically to be used to furnish food for his castle or dwelling. The name 'Borland' occurs in the names of the properties of Borlandhill, Over Borland, North Borland and Laigh Borland.

Middle Rig runs below the Fox Covert wood and Corsbie Craigs lies to the south with Black Craigs to the north-west with a White Craigs just across the Glazert Water. The name 'Glazert' may come from the Gaelic glas that means grey or green and dur meaning water. Corsbie or Crosbie refers to a 'cross' with the Scandinavian suffix '-by' meaning a settlement.

A 'Rig' is a long narrow ridge and a 'Fox Covert' was usually woodland reserved for fox breeding, feeding, etc. in relation to fox hunting. A 'craig' is a cliff. The Sandy Ford derives its name from the coarse sand that accumulates there to this day.

Barbara Gilmour
Andrew Brown of Over Hill aka 'The Hill' who died in 1791 was the grandson of John Dunlop of Over Hill, husband of Barbara Gilmour. As previously mentioned, Mary Dunlop, daughter of John Dunlop of Borland and Jean Gilmour of Tailend, had half of Borland (Borland House) with her husband Andrew Brown and died at the Hill aka Over Hill in Dunlop parish, the property of her mother's brother-in-law, in 1839.

Barbara Gilmour or Dunlop was a significant figure in 17th century Ayrshire having introduced a method of cheese making which became common throughout Ayrshire and beyond, providing employment and extra income for farmers and others.

Micro-history
A Cunninghame of Borland was involved in a raid against Drumlanrig in 1650.

in 1618 Gabriel Porterfield married Mariot Crawfurd and inherited the lands of Gills, Lothrihill, the Templeland and Maynes (Mains) of Hapland, including the mansion house and also acquired Dunlop Hill.

Local tradition has it that a Ley Tunnel runs from the site of Laigh Borland House to Aiket Castle.

A Mr 'Pop' McGaw was one of the last tenants of Laigh Borland.

An artificial fox den built with stones existed in the fox covert wood to encourage foxes to breed for the purposes of the hunt.

One of the group of four who removed the Stone of Scone from Westminster Abbey in 1950 was descended from the Watt family of Laigh Borland.

See also

 Dunlop, East Ayrshire
 Barbara Gilmour
 Barony and Castle of Corsehill
 Barony of Aiket
 Lands of Templehouse
 Lands of Sevenacres

References
Notes

Sources

 Archaeological & Historical Collections relating to Ayr & Wigton. 1884. Vol. IV. Shedden-Dobie, John. The Church of Dunlop.
 Bayne, John F. (1935). Dunlop Parish - A History of Church, Parish, and Nobility. Edinburgh : T. & A. Constable.
 Dobie, James D. (ed Dobie, J.S.) (1876). Cunninghame, Topographized by Timothy Pont 1604–1608, with continuations and illustrative notices. Glasgow: John Tweed.
 Fullarton, John (1864). Historical Memoir of the family of Eglinton and Winton. Ardrossan : Arthur Guthrie.
 Johnston, J. B. (1903). Place-names of Scotland. Edinburgh : David Douglas.
 Mackenzie, W. Mackay (1927). The Medieval Castle in Scotland. Pub. Methuen & Co. Ltd.
 MacIntosh, John (1894). Ayrshire Nights Entertainments: A Descriptive Guide to the History, Traditions, Antiquities, etc. of the County of Ayr. Pub. Kilmarnock.
 McMichael, George (c. 1881 - 1890). Notes on the Way Through Ayrshire and the Land of Burn, Wallace, Henry the Minstrel, and Covenant Martyrs. Hugh Henry : Ayr.
 Ness, John (1990). Kilwinning Encyclopedia. Kilwinning & District Preservation Society.
 Paterson, James (1863–66). History of the Counties of Ayr and Wigton. V. - IV - Cunninghame. Part 1. Edinburgh : J. Stillie.

External links
 Dunlop Village and District in 1913
  Photographs of Laigh Borland - 'Then and Now'
  Video footage of Laigh Borland

Ruins in East Ayrshire
Buildings and structures in East Ayrshire
Christianity in medieval Scotland
History of Scotland by location
Religious places
Former country houses in Scotland
History of East Ayrshire
Demolished buildings and structures in Scotland